Mamedov or Mammadov  (Azerbaijani: Məmmədov, Russian: Мамедов) is a surname of Soviet Azerbaijan origin; its feminine counterpart is Mamedova. Notable people with the surname include:

Mamedov 
 Enver Mamedov (born 1923), Soviet broadcasting official
 Georgiy Mamedov (born 1947), Soviet and Russian diplomat
 Gyunduz Mamedov (born 1974), Ukrainian jurist, Prosecutor of Odessa, Prosecutor of the Autonomous Republic of Crimea
 Rauf Mamedov (born 1988), Azerbaijani chess Grandmaster

Mamedova 
 Farida Mamedova (1936–2021), Azerbaijani historian
 Sakina Mamedova (born 1985), Uzbekistani sports shooter

Surnames
ru:Мамедов
Surnames of Georgian origin
Surnames of Azerbaijani origin
Azerbaijani-language surnames
Surnames of Uzbekistani origin